Ireland national football team may refer to:

Association football (soccer)
 Ireland national football team (1882–1950), the Irish Football Association's (IFA) original all-island team; first played in 1882
 Northern Ireland national football team, the successor to the original IFA team; sometimes played as "Ireland" until the 1970s
 Northern Ireland women's national football team
 Republic of Ireland national football team, the current Football Association of Ireland (FAI) team, previously played as "Irish Free State" and then "Ireland"; first played in 1926
 Republic of Ireland women's national football team
 Proposed all-Ireland football team, a proposed future team to represent the whole island of Ireland

Other sports
 Ireland international rules football team
 Irish national Australian rules football team
 Ireland national futsal team
 Ireland national rugby union team
 Ireland national rugby league team

fr:Équipe d'Irlande de football